Daniel James Collins (died May 5, 1926) was an American politician from New York.

Life
He was born in New York City. He attended the public schools. Then he became a printer.

Collins was elected as a member of the Independence League to the New York State Assembly (Kings Co., 15th D.), and sat in the 130th New York State Legislature in 1907.

He died on May 5, 1926, at his home at 1488 Bushwick Ave. in Brooklyn.

References

Year of birth missing
1926 deaths
Politicians from Brooklyn
Members of the New York State Assembly
United States Independence Party politicians